Middlesbrough South and East Cleveland is a constituency created in 1997 represented in the House of Commons of the UK Parliament since 2017 by Simon Clarke of the Conservative Party.

Boundaries 

1997–2010: The Redcar and Cleveland Borough Council wards of Belmont, Brotton, Guisborough, Hutton, Lockwood and Skinningrove, Loftus, Saltburn, and Skelton, and the Middlesbrough Borough Council wards of Easterside, Hemlington, Marton, Newham, Nunthorpe, Park End, and Stainton and Thornton.

2010–present: The Borough of Redcar and Cleveland wards of Brotton, Guisborough, Hutton, Lockwood, Loftus, Saltburn, Skelton, and Westworth, and the Borough of Middlesbrough wards of Coulby Newham, Hemlington, Ladgate, Marton, Marton West, Nunthorpe, Park End, and Stainton and Thornton.

The constituency was created in 1997, mostly replacing the former seat of Langbaurgh and consists of the southern outskirts of Middlesbrough (such as Acklam, Hemlington, Nunthorpe, Coulby Newham, Marton, Easterside and Park End) and those parts of the Redcar and Cleveland district not in the Redcar constituency.  These include Saltburn-by-the-Sea, Guisborough, Loftus, Skelton and Brotton.

History
Summary of results
This seat was created in 1997 and was held until 2017 by a representative of the Labour Party. Election results have to date been considerably more close than in the overwhelmingly urban, city seat of Middlesbrough, this instead being a marginal seat, particularly the 2010, 2015 and 2017 results which saw no absolute majority unlike the previous three absolute majorities won by Ashok Kumar of the Labour Party.  In the five elections from 1997 to 2015, the second-positioned candidate was a Conservative.  The 2015 result gave the seat the 20th-smallest majority of Labour's 232 seats by percentage of majority. At the 2017 general election, the seat was gained by Simon Clarke of the Conservative Party on a 3.6% swing, one of the six seats in England gained by the Conservatives at that election. 

Third-placed parties
In each election to date the fourth-placed and lower candidates have failed to reach 5% of the vote, therefore forfeiting their deposits.  In 2015 the third-placed party in line with national trends changed from the Liberal Democrats to UKIP on large swings; candidates from the third-placed parties in this area have always kept their deposit except in the 2017 and 2019 elections.

Turnout
Turnout has varied from 76% in 1997 to just over 60% in 2005.

Constituency profile

Whereas 13.8% of people in Middlesbrough are retired, 0.3 lower than in 2001, 19.4% of people are retired in the eastern Cleveland authority, Redcar and Cleveland, 3% higher than in 2001 (2011 figures). The constituency is at the forefront of Britain's return to growth in output, however the western authority still in 2011 had the highest unemployment claimant count in the North East, having witnessed a decline in the major local industry of production of industrial and heavy duty steel.

Members of Parliament

Elections

Elections in the 2010s

Elections in the 2000s

Elections in the 1990s

See also 
 List of parliamentary constituencies in Cleveland
 History of parliamentary constituencies and boundaries in Cleveland

Notes

References

Parliamentary constituencies in North East England
Constituencies of the Parliament of the United Kingdom established in 1997
Politics of Middlesbrough